Rehabilitation (transliterated in English as reabilitatsiya or academically rendered as reabilitacija) was a term used in the context of the former Soviet Union and the post-Soviet states. Beginning after the death of Stalin in 1953, the government undertook the political and social restoration, or political rehabilitation, of persons who had been repressed and criminally prosecuted without due basis. It restored the person to the state of acquittal. In many cases, rehabilitation was posthumous, as thousands of victims had been executed or died in labor camps.

The government also rehabilitated several minority populations which it had relocated under Stalin, and allowed them to return to their former territories and in some cases restored their autonomy in those regions.

Post-Stalinism epoch
The government started mass amnesty of the victims of Soviet repressions after the death of Joseph Stalin. In 1953, this did not entail any form of exoneration. The government released those who were granted amnesty into internal exile in remote areas, without any right to return to their original places of settlement.

The amnesty of 1953 was applied  for those who had been sentenced for a term of at most 5 years and had been prosecuted for non-political articles in the Soviet Criminal Code (for example, children of those repressed on political grounds were often prosecuted as "antisocial elements", i.e., on the same grounds as prostitutes). In 1954, the government began to release many political prisoners from Gulag labor camps.

In 1956, Nikita Khrushchev, then in the position of First Secretary of the Communist Party of the Soviet Union, denounced Stalinism in his notable speech "On the Cult of Personality and Its Consequences". Afterward, the government accompanied release of political prisoners with rehabilitation, allowing them to return home and reclaim their lives.

Several entire nationality groups had been deported to Siberia, Kazakhstan, and Central Asia during population transfer; these were also rehabilitated in the late 1950s.  The government allowed many of those groups to return to their former homelands and restored their former autonomous regions. It did not restore territory to the Volga Germans and Crimean Tatars.

In most cases, the persons were released with the phrases "due to the lack of a criminal matter", "for lack of corpus delicti", "based on previously unavailable information",  "due to the lack of a proof of guilt", etc. Many rehabilitations occurred posthumously, as thousands had been executed by Stalin's government or died in the harsh conditions of the labor camps.

Many individuals were subject to amnesty only, but not to rehabilitation (in particular those who had been prosecuted for "belonging to Trotskyite Opposition").

Perestroika and post-Soviet states
Another wave of rehabilitations started about 1986 with emerging Soviet policy of perestroika. Persons who were repressed extrajudicially were summarily rehabilitated. Also, Soviet civilian and military justice continued to rehabilitate victims of Stalin's purges (posthumously), as well as some people repressed after Stalin. After dissolution of the Soviet Union in late 1991, this trend continued in most post-Soviet states.. Leon Trotsky (murdered in 1940) was rehabilitated on June 16, 2001.

Both the modern Russian Federation and Ukraine have enacted laws "On the Rehabilitation of the Victims of Political Repressions", which provide the basis for the continued post-Stalinist rehabilitation of victims.

See also
On the Rehabilitation of Repressed Peoples

References

Further reading
Adler, N. The Gulag Survivor:  Beyond the Soviet System.  New Brunswick, New Jersey, USA/London: Transaction Publishers, 2002.
Iakovlev, A. (ed.) Reabilitatsiia:  politicheskie protsessy 30–50-kh godov.  Moscow:  Politizdat, 1991.
 
Smith, K. Remembering Stalin’s Victims:  Popular Memory and the End of the USSR. Ithaca, New York: Cornell University Press, 1996.

Law of Russia
Political repression in the Soviet Union
Soviet law
Soviet phraseology
 
De-Stalinization

sr:Рехабилитација